Nicolaj Bo Larsen (born 10 November 1971 in Roskilde) is a Danish former professional cyclist, who currently works as a directeur sportif for UCI Continental team . He is most notable for winning a stage of the 1996 Giro d'Italia and winning the Danish National Road Race Championships twice.

Major results

1993
 1st Stage 2 Milk Race
1994
 3rd Road race, National Road Championships
1995
 1st Stage 2 Milk Race
 3rd Grand Prix Guillaume Tell
1996
 1st Stage 17 Giro d'Italia
 2nd Giro del Mendrisiotto
1997
 1st  Road race, National Road Championships
1998
 2nd Frankfurt Grand Prix
1999
 1st  Road race, National Road Championships
 1st Fyen Rundt
 1st Stage 4 Tour of Sweden
 Herald Sun Tour
1st Stages 2 & 10
 2nd GP Aarhus
 6th Overall Tour Down Under
1st Stage 1
2000
 2nd Road race, National Road Championships
 3rd USPRO Championship
2001
 1st Fyen Rundt
 2nd Road race, National Road Championships
 2nd Grand Prix d'Ouverture La Marseillaise
 2nd Tour du Haut Var
 2nd GP Aarhus

References

External links

1971 births
Living people
Danish male cyclists
Danish Giro d'Italia stage winners
People from Roskilde
Sportspeople from Region Zealand